Carberry Creek is a stream in the U.S. state of Oregon. It empties into Applegate Lake.

Carberry Creek was named after Jim Carberry, a businessperson in the local mining industry.

References

Rivers of Oregon
Rivers of Jackson County, Oregon